Hava Lazarus–Yafeh (1930–1998) was a German-born Israeli Orientalist, scholar, editor, and educator. She known for her work in medieval and modern Islamic Studies and interfaith relations. Lazarus–Yafeh was a professor and a head of the Department for Islamic Civilization at the Hebrew University of Jerusalem. She won the Israel Prize in history in 1993.

Biography 
Hava Lazarus was born on May 6, 1930 in Wiesbaden, Province of Hesse-Nassau, Weimar Republic (present-day Germany) to a Jewish family. Her mother was Jadwiga Walfisz, a teacher; and her father was a noted German Rabbi . In November 1938, the Wiesbaden Synagogue, where her father had recently retired from, was destroyed on Kristallnacht. In February 1939, the Lazarus family emigrated to Mandatory Palestine. She attended Hebrew Reali School in Haifa. In 1954 she married teacher Immanuel Yafeh.

Lazarus–Yafeh graduated in 1950 from Gordon College of Education (formerly Haifa Teachers' College). She completed her BA degree in 1953, and MA degree in 1958 at the Hebrew University of Jerusalem.

She started teaching at the Hebrew University of Jerusalem in 1962, while she was a student. She was a post-doctoral fellow and visiting researcher at Harvard University in Cambridge, Massachusetts from 1965 to 1966. She served as the head of the Department for Islamic Civilization at Hebrew University of Jerusalem from 1968 to 1971.

She died on September 6, 1998 in Jerusalem.

Publications

Books

Articles and chapters

As editor

References  

1930 births
1998 deaths
20th-century Israeli Jews
Hebrew University of Jerusalem alumni
Academic staff of the Hebrew University of Jerusalem
Israeli orientalists
German emigrants to Mandatory Palestine
20th-century Israeli women
Hebrew Reali School alumni